Sanxing (Chinese: , lit. "three stars") can refer to:


Places

China
, a township in Enyang District, Bazhong, Sichuan
, a town in Jianyang, Chengdu, Sichuan
, a town in Jintang County, Chengdu, Sichuan
, a town in Chongming District, Shanghai
, a township in Shizhu County, Chongqing
, a town in Shuangliu District, Chengdu, Sichuan
Sanxing, a historical name of Yilan County, Heilongjiang
Sanxing railway station, a station on the Suiyu Railway in Suining, Sichuan
Sanxingdui, an archeological site in Guanghan, Sichuan

Taiwan
 Sanxing, Yilan, a township in Yilan County

Other
 Sanxing (deities), three gods in Chinese religion
 Samsung, in Chinese

See also
 Sanxian, a Chinese lute
 Sanxiang, a town in Zhongshan, Guangdong, China
 Samsung, written with the same Hanja